Tegryn is a hilltop linear village in north Pembrokeshire, Wales, in the community and parish of Clydau and is the largest settlement in the community.

Description
Tegryn is a village in the north Pembrokeshire community of Clydau and is home to the Clydau Community Centre (Canolfan Clydau), a charity. It was opened in November 2014 and cost £600,000.

The village has a pub, the Butchers Arms, a post office (established in 1948), a garage and a primary school.

Education
In 1860 a schoolroom was built near the chapel. The present school in Tegryn is Ysgol Clydau Primary School. A 2008-9 Estyn report described the school as having a strong Welsh ethos; there were 63 pupils between 4 and 11 years old, and a third of pupils used Welsh as a main language at home.

In 2014 there were 53 children at the school.

Worship

A Welsh Independent chapel was established at Llwyn-yr-hwrdd to the south of the village in 1805. It was rebuilt in 1817 and 1846, and in 1873 it had a membership of 335.

References

External links

Clydau parish map on GENUKI
Tegryn School

Villages in Pembrokeshire